Pukk is an Estonian surname, and may refer to:
 Aapo Pukk (born 1962), Estonian artist
 Holger Pukk (1920–1997), Estonian writer
 Otto Pukk (1900–1951), Estonian politician

References

Estonian-language surnames